The Vad (in its upper course also: Căprărețu) is a right tributary of the river Olt in Romania. It discharges into the Olt in Lazaret.

References

Rivers of Romania
Rivers of Sibiu County
Rivers of Vâlcea County